Václav Mls (born 17 July 1949) is a Czech rower. He competed in the men's eight event at the 1976 Summer Olympics.

References

1949 births
Living people
Czech male rowers
Olympic rowers of Czechoslovakia
Rowers at the 1976 Summer Olympics
Rowers from Prague